is a Japanese shōnen manga magazine published by Ichijinsha. The first issue was sold on December 9, 2005, and is sold monthly on the ninth. Manga collected into bound volumes which were serialized in this magazine are published under Ichijinsha's  imprint.

The four-panel comic strip magazine Manga 4koma Kings Palette started as a special edition of Comic Rex before becoming an independent magazine, as did the cross-dressing-themed manga magazine Waai!.

Serialized titles
30-sai no Hoken Taiiku
Appli-Trap
Arknights: Operators!
Black Sweep Sisters
Boku ga Josō shite Hīte mitara Baresō na Ken
Bus Gamer
Cylcia=Code
Cynthia the Mission
Dear Emily...
Eden*
Engaged to the Unidentified
Eru Eru Sister
Etrian Odyssey II: Snow Girl
Kaii Ikasama Hakuran Tei
Gakuen Tengoku Paradoxia
Gau Gau Wāta
Gendai Majo zukan
Gene Cha!
Gunjin Shōjo, Ōritsu Mahō Gakuen ni Sennyū Suru Koto ni Narimashita. ~Otome Game? Sonna no Kiitemasen kedo?~
Gyakushū! Pappara-tai
Hand×Red
Heroine Voice
Himegoto
Himena Kamena
Hundred: Radiant Red Rose
Jū Ten!
Jūsho Mitei
Kamiari
Kannagi: Crazy Shrine Maidens
Kanpachi: Crazy Seriola Dumerili
Yuripachi: Loose a Morning-star Lily (YuruYuri & Kanpachi)
Kare to Kanojo no Kyōkaisen
Ki o Tsukena yo, Onē-san.
Kigyō Sentai Salary Man
Kuroji Tabiki: Chaos Aisle
Kyonyū to Loli to Boyish
Little Busters! Kudryavka Noumi
Long Riders!
Macross Delta: Ginga o michibiku Utahime
Masamune-kun no Re nantoka
Masamune-kun's Revenge
Meikyū Gai Rondo: Hareta Hi ni wa Tsurugi o Motte.
Memeru-san no Shitsuji
Mida Love
Miss Caretaker of Sunohara-sou
Mitgura
Ms, Rinna's Lovesickness!
Mugen Ryōiki
My Wife is the Student Council President
Na Na Ki!!
Niji to Kuro (ongoing)
No Matter What You Say, Furi-san is Scary!
Onigokko
Oni Hime
Ore to Maid to Tokidoki Okan
Ore Yachō Kansatsuki
Orichalcum Reycal Duo
Reverend D
Rin-chan now
Roripo Unlimited
Sei Kai Ibun
Senran Kagura: Guren no Uroboros
Shinozaki Himeno no Koigokoro Q&A
Shirasuna-mura
Shiritsu Sairyō Kōkō Chōnōryoku-bu
Shomin Sample
Shōnen Blanky Jet
Sōkai Kessen
SoltyRei: Aka no Shukujo
Sora Yome
Soul Gadget Radiant
Tadashii Kokka Tsukurikata.
Take Moon
Tales of Berseria
Tales of Legendia
Tanakaha
The Idolmaster
Asayake wa Kogane-iro: The Idolmaster (ongoing)
The Idolmaster: Cinderella Girls
The Idolmaster: Relations
The Ode to the Esperides
The Wizard of Battlefield
Touhou Bōgetsushō: Silent Sinner in Blue
Tsuki to Otakara
Twinkle Saber Nova (ongoing)
Wish Upon the Pleiades: Prism Palette
World Conquest Zvezda Plot
Yatogame-chan Kansatsu Nikki (ongoing)
Yes Lolita! but Father?

References

External links
Comic Rex's official website 

2005 establishments in Japan
Ichijinsha magazines
Monthly manga magazines published in Japan
Magazines established in 2005
Shōnen manga magazines